Gérard Ghidini (June 8, 1943 – September 14, 2012) was a French slalom canoeist who competed in the mid-1960s. He won a bronze medal in the mixed C-2 team event at the 1965 ICF Canoe Slalom World Championships in Spittal.

References

1943 births
2012 deaths
French male canoeists
Medalists at the ICF Canoe Slalom World Championships